Dan Dries (born April 12, 1988) is an American former professional ice hockey player who most notably played in the American Hockey League (AHL) and Finnish Liiga.

Playing career
Undrafted and having played collegiate hockey with the University of New Hampshire of the Hockey East and later the Ohio State University in the Central Collegiate Hockey Association, Dries made his professional debut at the tail end of the 2011–12 season, signing an amateur try-out with the St. John's IceCaps of the AHL.

On October 17, 2012, Dries signed a try-out agreement with Ilves of the SM-liiga. He played 13 games and registered 1 assist and 10 penalty minutes with the European team before returning to North America where he completed the 2012–13 season with the Orlando Solar Bears of the ECHL.

Career statistics

References

External links

1988 births
American men's ice hockey forwards
Cedar Rapids RoughRiders players
Ilves players
Kalamazoo Wings (ECHL) players
Living people
New Hampshire Wildcats men's ice hockey players
Ohio Junior Blue Jackets players
Ohio State Buckeyes men's ice hockey players
Ontario Reign (ECHL) players
Orlando Solar Bears (ECHL) players
People from Lake Orion, Michigan
St. John's IceCaps players